Hans van den Doel may refer to:

 Hans van den Doel (Labour Party) (1937–2012), Dutch politician of the Labour Party
 Hans van den Doel (People's Party for Freedom and Democracy) (1955–2010), Dutch politician of the People's Party for Freedom and Democracy